That Is All may refer to:

 That Is All (book), a 2011 book by John Hodgman
 "That Is All" (song), a 1973 song by George Harrison

See also
 That's All (disambiguation)